Beaton's Cottage (also known as Beaton's Croft) is a croft dwelling in Bornesketaig, Isle of Skye, Scotland, near the island's northern tip. A Category A listed, it was built around 1880 and is in "quite excellent condition". It is a single-storey construction, three bays with centre door, of whitewashed rubble with rounded corners. It has small four-pane windows, with one similar window in the rear,  gable-end chimney stacks and a piended thatched roof. A single-storey byre of same build is lit by two skylights.

Gallery

See also
List of listed buildings in Highland

References

19th-century establishments in Scotland
Category A listed buildings in Highland (council area)
Buildings and structures in the Isle of Skye